Symplocos shilanensis is a species of plant in the family Symplocaceae. It is endemic to Taiwan.  It is threatened by habitat loss.

References

Endemic flora of Taiwan
shilanensis
Endangered plants
Taxonomy articles created by Polbot